The 2016–17 NCAA Division I men's basketball season began on November 11, 2016. The first tournament was the 2K Sports Classic, and ended with the Final Four in Glendale, Arizona on April 3, 2017. Practices officially began on September 30, 2016.

Rule changes
The only rule change for the regular season was allowing coaches to ask for timeouts in situations of inbounds on offense or defense. Coaches are still not permitted to call timeouts in live-ball situations.

The NCAA approved a number of experimental rule changes for use in the 2017 postseason NIT:
 Team fouls were reset to zero at the 10:00 mark of each half. This effectively divided the game into quarters for purposes of team fouls.
 The "one-and-one" foul shot was not used. Instead, starting with the fifth total foul in each 10-minute period, non-shooting fouls by the defensive team resulted in two free throws, with the only exception being administrative technical fouls. This mirrored foul counting in NCAA women's basketball, which has been played in quarters since the 2015–16 season.
 In a feature unique in the college game, but similar to that used by the NBA and WNBA, each overtime was considered a separate period for purposes of accumulating team fouls. The team foul limit was 3 per overtime period, with all non-shooting team fouls thereafter by the defense resulting in two free throws. 
 The shot clock was reset to 20 seconds whenever the ball was inbounded in the frontcourt.

Season headlines
 March 10, 2016 – The Ivy League announced it will add a conference tournament beginning in the 2016–17 season. Previously, the regular season champion earned the automatic berth into the NCAA tournament.
 April 20 – The NCAA announces its Academic Progress Rate (APR) sanctions for the 2016–17 school year. A total of 23 programs in 13 sports are declared ineligible for postseason play due to failure to meet the required APR benchmark, including the following two Division I men's basketball teams:
 Alcorn State
 Savannah State
 April 28 – The Atlantic Sun Conference announced that effective with the 2016–17 school year, it would rebrand itself as the ASUN Conference.
 November 2 – The Associated Press preseason All-American team was released. Duke guard Grayson Allen was the leading vote-getter (61 votes). Joining him on the team were California forward Ivan Rabb (55 votes), Villanova guard Josh Hart (53), Oregon forward Dillon Brooks (30) and Iowa State guard Monté Morris (24).
 November 22 – Fort Wayne upset 3rd-ranked Indiana for the first win over a ranked team in the program's history.
 December 5 – The Atlantic Sun Conference (ASUN) announced that North Alabama would move from the Division II Gulf South Conference and join the ASUN in 2018.
 January 2 – Duke announced that head coach Mike Krzyzewski would undergo surgery on January 6 to remove a fragment of a herniated disc in his lower back. He went on a medical leave following the Blue Devils' January 4 game against Georgia Tech and was expected to be out for about four weeks. Associate head coach Jeff Capel took over for Krzyzewski during his recuperation.
 January 5 – Before Austin Peay's game against Tennessee Tech, Peay announced that Dave Loos, the Governors' head coach since 1990, would take a medical leave effective immediately. Loos, who had undergone surgery to remove a malignant tumor from his colon in July 2016, has since been undergoing chemotherapy for a cancerous lymph node found during that procedure. Assistant Jay Bowen served as interim head coach until Loos returned to the sidelines on January 19.
 January 13 – The Western Athletic Conference announced that California Baptist would move from the Division II Pacific West Conference and join the WAC in 2018.
 January 24 – For only the third time since the AP Poll was first compiled for college basketball in 1948, three of the top four teams lost on the same day. First, #2 Kansas lost 85–69 at West Virginia. Shortly thereafter, top-ranked Villanova lost 74–72 at Marquette. Finally, #4 Kentucky lost 82–80 at Tennessee.
 January 26 – The Summit League announced that North Dakota, currently a member of the Big Sky Conference, would join the league in 2018.
 February 4
 Six teams in the AP Top 10 lose, tying the poll-era record for most losses by top-10 teams in one day. Additionally, it was the first day in poll history in which two of the top three teams (Baylor and Kansas) lost at home to unranked opponents.
 Krzyzewski returns from his medical leave to the Duke bench, with the Blue Devils defeating Pittsburgh 72–64.
 March 8 – A plane carrying Michigan to the Big Ten tournament in Washington, D.C. skidded off the runway and crashed while trying to take off from Willow Run Airport near Ypsilanti, Michigan. No one was injured, and the team safely arrived in Washington on a flight the following morning.
 March 13 – The Republican of Springfield, Massachusetts reported that a federal lawsuit had been filed against several UMass staff members. The suit was filed in December 2016 by a former girlfriend of assistant Lou Roe, and names Roe and three other staff members, including since-fired head coach Derek Kellogg, as defendants. The suit alleges that she was intimidated and falsely imprisoned in an attempt to keep her silent about doping by team members, domestic violence incidents involving staff members, and quashing of criminal complaints against team members.

Milestones and records
During the season, the following players reached the 2000 career point milestone – NJIT guard Damon Lynn, Valparaiso forward Alec Peters, North Florida guard Dallas Moore, Santa Clara guard Jared Brownridge, VMI guard Q. J. Peterson, Winthrop guard Keon Johnson, Northwestern State guard Zeek Woodley, Lehigh center Tim Kempton Jr., Davidson guard Jack Gibbs, Weber State guard Jeremy Senglin, Monmouth guard Justin Robinson, and Texas A&M–Corpus Christi forward Rashawn Thomas.
 November 11 – NJIT's Damon Lynn surpasses Chris Flores as the school's all-time leading scorer for their Division I era.
 January 3 – Jacksonville's Darius Dawkins made 13-of-17 three-pointers en route to 41 points. He set both school and ASUN Conference single game three-point scoring records in the process, which were previously 10 and 11, respectively.
 January 7 – Colorado State head coach Larry Eustachy won his 500th game in Division I. The Rams defeated Air Force 85–58.
 February 11 – Villanova head coach Jay Wright won his 500th game in Division I. The Wildcats defeated Xavier 73–57.
 February 16 – Austin Peay head coach Dave Loos also won his 500th game in Division I. The Governors defeated Eastern Illinois 85–80.
 March 7 – With Gonzaga's 74–56 win over Saint Mary's in the final of the West Coast Conference tournament, the Bulldogs' Przemek Karnowski became the winningest player in NCAA Division I men's history, although the NCAA does not officially recognize this milestone. This was Karnowski's 132nd winning appearance, surpassing the 131 of Duke's Shane Battier. Karnowski would ultimately finish with 137 wins.
March 9 – John Beilein becomes the winningest coach in Michigan Wolverines men's basketball history (210 wins).
March 18 – Gonzaga head coach Mark Few reached the 500-win mark in the Bulldogs' 79–73 win over Northwestern in the second round of the NCAA tournament. Among Division I men's coaches, only Adolph Rupp and Jerry Tarkanian reached the milestone in fewer games.

Conference membership changes

Only one school joined a new conference for 2016–17:

New arenas
 South Dakota opened the new Sanford Coyote Sports Center. The completion of the 6,000-seat venue saw the South Dakota men's basketball, women's basketball, and women's volleyball teams move out of the considerably larger DakotaDome, which remains home to football, track & field, and swimming & diving. The first men's basketball game in the new arena was an exhibition on November 4 against NCAA Division III Loras, with the Coyotes winning 106–76; the first official men's game was the second leg of a November 13 doubleheader with the Coyotes women's team, with the men defeating Bowling Green 78–72.
 North Dakota State opened the renovated Scheels Center. This completion brought the previously outdated Bison Sports Arena up to full Division 1 standards. The arena resumed competition of their men's basketball, women's basketball, and wrestling teams inside the Scheels Center. The renovated arena seats 5,700 people on the North side of NDSU's campus in Fargo, North Dakota. The first game played in the renovated arena was an exhibition on November 2, 2016 against NCAA Division III Concordia College (Moorhead, Minnesota), the Bison winning that game 90-53. The first official men's game was on November 11, 2016; the Bison beat Arkansas State 76-66.

This proved to be the last season for four Division I teams in their then-current venues:
 DePaul, located in Chicago, left its current off-campus home of Allstate Arena in suburban Rosemont, Illinois for a new off-campus arena in the city proper. Wintrust Arena, a 10,000-seat venue at the McCormick Place convention center, opened for the 2017–18 season.
 NJIT left one on-campus venue for another. The aging Fleisher Center (capacity 1,600) was replaced by the Wellness and Events Center (capacity 3,500) for the 2017–18 season.
 Robert Morris closed the Charles L. Sewall Center, the on-campus home to the Colonials since 1985, in June 2017. At the time, the UPMC Events Center was being built at the Sewall Center site and was originally scheduled to open in the middle of the 2018–19 basketball season. The Colonials played most of their 2017–18 home games at PPG Paints Arena in downtown Pittsburgh, with another Pittsburgh venue, Duquesne's A. J. Palumbo Center, used when PPG Paints Arena was not available. Due to construction delays, the Colonials ultimately played their entire 2018–19 home schedule at the Student Recreation and Fitness Center, a facility that opened in 2017 at the on-campus North Athletic Complex as part of the UPMC Events Center project.
 Wofford also moved within its campus, abandoning its home since 1981, Benjamin Johnson Arena (capacity 3,500), for the new Jerry Richardson Indoor Stadium (capacity 3,400).

Season outlook

Pre–season polls

 
The top 25 from the AP and USA Today Coaches Polls.

Regular season

Early season tournaments

Upsets

An upset is a victory by an underdog team.  In the context of NCAA Division I Men's Basketball, this generally constitutes an unranked team defeating a team currently ranked in the Top 25. This list will highlight those upsets of ranked teams by unranked teams as well as upsets of #1 teams. Rankings are from the AP poll.

Conference winners and tournaments
Each of the 32 Division I athletic conferences ends its regular season with a single-elimination tournament. The team with the best regular-season record in each conference is given the number one seed in each tournament, with tiebreakers used as needed in the case of ties for the top seeding. The winners of these tournaments receive automatic invitations to the 2017 NCAA Division I men's basketball tournament. This was the first season in which the Ivy League held a conference tournament.

Statistical leaders

Postseason

NCAA tournament

Tournament upsets
For this list, an "upset" is defined as a win by a team seeded 7 or more spots below its defeated opponent.

This definition is based solely on seeding—in the Middle Tennessee–Minnesota game listed below, the #12 seed Middle Tennessee entered the game as a 1.5-point favorite in Las Vegas sports books.

Final Four – University of Phoenix Stadium, Glendale, AZ

National Invitation tournament

After the NCAA tournament field was announced, the NCAA invited 32 teams to participate in the National Invitation Tournament. The tournament began on March 14, 2017 with all games prior to the semifinals being played at campus sites.

NIT Semifinals and Final
Played at Madison Square Garden in New York City on March 28 and 30

College Basketball Invitational

The tenth College Basketball Invitational (CBI) Tournament began on March 14, 2017. This tournament features 16 teams who were left out of the NCAA tournament and NIT.

CollegeInsider.com Postseason tournament

The seventh CollegeInsider.com Postseason Tournament began on March 13, 2017 and ended with the championship game on March 31. This tournament places an emphasis on selecting successful teams from "mid-major" conferences who were left out of the NCAA tournament and NIT. 26 teams participate in this tournament.

Conference standings

Award winners

2017 Consensus All-America team

Major player of the year awards
Wooden Award: Frank Mason III, Kansas 
Naismith Award: Frank Mason III, Kansas
Associated Press Player of the Year: Frank Mason III, Kansas 
NABC Player of the Year: Frank Mason III, Kansas
Oscar Robertson Trophy (USBWA): Frank Mason III, Kansas
Sporting News Player of the Year: Frank Mason III, Kansas

Major freshman of the year awards
Wayman Tisdale Award (USBWA): Lonzo Ball, UCLA
NABC Freshman of the Year: Lonzo Ball, UCLA
Sporting News Freshman of the Year: Lonzo Ball, UCLA

Major coach of the year awards
Associated Press Coach of the Year: Mark Few, Gonzaga
Henry Iba Award (USBWA): Mark Few, Gonzaga
NABC Coach of the Year: Mark Few, Gonzaga
Naismith College Coach of the Year: Mark Few, Gonzaga 
 Sporting News Coach of the Year: Mark Few, Gonzaga

Other major awards
Bob Cousy Award (Best point guard): Frank Mason III, Kansas
Jerry West Award (Best shooting guard): Malik Monk, Kentucky
Julius Erving Award (Best small forward): Josh Hart, Villanova 
Karl Malone Award (Best power forward): Johnathan Motley, Baylor
Kareem Abdul-Jabbar Award (Best center): Przemek Karnowski, Gonzaga
Pete Newell Big Man Award (Best big man): Caleb Swanigan, Purdue 
NABC Defensive Player of the Year: Jevon Carter, West Virginia
Senior CLASS Award (top senior): Josh Hart, Villanova 
Robert V. Geasey Trophy (Top player in Philadelphia Big 5): Josh Hart, Villanova
Haggerty Award (Top player in New York City metro area): Ángel Delgado, Seton Hall
Ben Jobe Award (Top minority coach): Jamion Christian, Mount St. Mary's
Hugh Durham Award (Top mid-major coach): Rod Barnes, Cal State Bakersfield
Jim Phelan Award (Top head coach): Frank Martin, South Carolina
Lefty Driesell Award (Top defensive player): Jevon Carter, West Virginia 
Lou Henson Award (Top mid-major player): Justin Robinson, Monmouth
Lute Olson Award (Top non-freshman or transfer player): Caleb Swanigan, Purdue
Skip Prosser Man of the Year Award (Coach with moral character): Danny Manning, Wake Forest
Academic All-American of the Year (Top scholar-athlete): Canyon Barry, Florida
Elite 90 Award (Top GPA among upperclass players at Final Four): Nigel Williams-Goss, Gonzaga
USBWA Most Courageous Award: Bronson Koenig, Wisconsin

Coaching changes
49 teams changed coaches during and after the season.

Attendances
2016-17 College basketball teams average home attendances of at least 10,000:

See also

2016–17 NCAA Division I women's basketball season

Notes

References